Robert Portal is an English actor. Portal is known for his role as Paul Critchley on the BBC television series The Amazing Mrs Pritchard (2006) and as the King in the film The Huntsman: Winter's War (2016). He is also known for his role as the Duke of Richmond on the ITV drama series ''Belgravia (2020).

Early life 
Portal was born in England and educated at Harrow School. He studied at the London Academy of Music and Dramatic Art (LAMDA) graduating in 1993 and also trained at the Royal Shakespeare Company.

Career

Film

Television

Theatre

References

External links
 

1967 births
20th-century English male actors
21st-century English male actors
British male film actors
English male film actors
English male stage actors
English male television actors
Living people